Colin Todd (born 12 December 1948) is an English football manager and former player. He was most recently the manager of Esbjerg fB. As a player, he made more than 600 appearances in the Football League, playing for Sunderland, Derby County, Everton, Birmingham City, Nottingham Forest, Oxford United and Luton Town, and also played in the North American Soccer League for the Vancouver Whitecaps. He won two Football League titles with Derby County during the 1970s, and won the PFA Players' Player of the Year award in 1975. He was capped by England on 27 occasions.

He has managed English league clubs Middlesbrough, Bolton Wanderers, Swindon Town, Derby County, Bradford City, Darlington and Danish Superliga side Randers FC. He took Bolton Wanderers to the Division One title with 98 points and 100 goals, although he was unable to establish them in the Premier League. Todd was also portrayed in the 2009 movie, The Damned United.

Playing career

Club career
The young Todd had opportunities to sign for Newcastle United and Middlesbrough, but chose Sunderland "because of their tradition for youth". He was a member of the youth team coached by Brian Clough in 1965, and played a major part in Sunderland's 1967 victory in the FA Youth Cup. By then Todd was already a first-team regular. He made his debut as substitute for Charlie Hurley in a 1–1 draw away against Chelsea in the First Division on 10 September 1966, and by mid-season had established himself in the starting eleven. He missed only three league games in the next three seasons, at the end of which Sunderland were relegated from the top flight. After 191 appearances and three goals in all competitions for Sunderland, Todd rejoined Clough at Derby County in February 1971.

On joining Derby, he had cost them a British record transfer fee for a defender of £175,000. When linked with the club, Brian Clough famously remarked "We're not signing Colin Todd, we can't afford him". He then signed him that same day. Clough sent the chairman Sam Longson a telegram informing him of the signing and the size of the fee: £175,000. He formed a defensive partnership with fellow England international Roy McFarland, winning two league titles together. Under Clough, Todd helped Derby win the First Division title in his first full season at the Baseball Ground and collected a second title winner's medal under Clough's successor Dave Mackay in 1975.

He won the PFA Players' Player of the Year award in 1975 – the same year that he won his second league title.

He later played for Everton, Birmingham City, Nottingham Forest, and Oxford United, finally retiring from playing in 1984 after a brief spell with Luton Town.

International career
He won 27 England caps. He made his international debut was against Northern Ireland on 23 May 1972, and his last appearance came on 28 May 1977, also against Northern Ireland.

Managerial career

Middlesbrough
Todd entered management in March 1990 with Middlesbrough, succeeding Bruce Rioch. He had coached the club from the Third Division to First Division in successive seasons but on taking the manager's job, Middlesbrough were struggling in the Second Division and facing the real threat of moving from the Third to First Division and back again in successive seasons. Todd kept the club in the Second Division and they qualified for the play-offs a year later, although they were denied the chance of promotion after losing to eventual winners Notts County in the semi-finals and Todd quit soon afterwards.

Bolton Wanderers
He moved on to Bolton Wanderers in 1992 as assistant to his predecessor at Middlesbrough, Bruce Rioch. After Rioch left to manage Arsenal, having achieved promotion in the 1994–95 season, McFarland moved to Bolton as joint-manager alongside Todd.

Bolton struggled to cope with the Premier League and McFarland was dismissed in early 1996, leaving Todd in sole charge. He was unable to prevent Bolton's relegation but guided them back to the top-flight by winning the First Division in the 1996–97 season, ensuring Bolton's new stadium would host Premier League football. Despite strengthening the squad with new signings, Bolton struggled in the top flight and were relegated again at the end of the season. Todd led the club to the play-off final in 1999 but lost to Watford, and he resigned seven games into the 1999–2000 season following the sale of Per Frandsen to Blackburn Rovers.

Despite Bolton's status as a yo-yo team in the mid-1990s, Todd's team is remembered with affection amongst the Wanderers support.

Swindon Town
Todd returned to management with Swindon Town. His spell at Swindon was unsuccessful as poor results meant the club faced a relegation battle when it had been hoped to gain promotion. Todd won only five out of twenty games with the club.

Derby County
Todd resigned as Swindon manager in November 2000 to return to Derby as assistant manager to Jim Smith. When Smith resigned in October 2001 Todd was promoted to manager but he was sacked after just three months having failed to improve the struggling club's form.

Bradford City
Todd joined Bradford City in 2003 as assistant to manager Bryan Robson. When Robson left at the end of the 2003–04 season, Todd was named his successor. It was the fourth time he had been promoted from assistant to manager. He became the longest serving Bradford manager for twenty years, and led the club to several mid-table finishes. After only winning once in ten games, Todd was sacked in February 2007. Shortly afterwards, the club was relegated to League Two and Todd pointed to the departure of key players and lack of funds for new signings as reasons for Bradford's demise.

Randers FC
Todd became manager of Danish side Randers FC in the summer of 2007, replacing the former Danish 1992 European champion Lars Olsen who had signed with Odense Boldklub. Todd was due to leave Randers at the end of June 2009, to be replaced by another 1992 European champion former Arsenal player John Jensen. However, in January 2009 Todd and Randers agreed to go separate ways. Jensen then took over as manager.

Darlington
Todd was announced as the new manager of League Two Darlington on 20 May 2009. He replaced Dave Penney who left the club to join League One side Oldham Athletic as a result of Darlington's administration. Todd brought Dean Windass, a player whom he had at Bradford City, as his assistant player manager. Darlington made a poor start to the 2009–10 season, and having picked up just one point from eight league games, Todd agreed with chairman Raj Singh that he would leave the club if they failed to win their ninth game against Grimsby Town. Darlington drew 1–1 with Grimsby and Todd, as well as Windass, left the club. They had won only one of their 11 games in charge, and none in the league—the club's worst start to a season.

After leaving Darlington, Todd is believed to have applied for the manager's job at English-based Scottish Football League Third Division side Berwick Rangers.

In 2012, Todd was scouting for his former club Birmingham City.

Second spells at Randers
On 5 June 2012, it was announced that Colin Todd would replace Michael Hemmingsen as caretaker for Randers F.C., until a replacement has been found for the club. On 3 August 2012, it was announced that Todd would continue as a 
more permanent manager at least until 31 December 2012. On 8 February 2013, UEFA recognised Todd's Coaching Diploma as valid, which meant that Randers could announce him as their permanent manager. On 4 May, Randers FC announced that Todd would leave the club following the 2015–16 Danish Superliga season. Initially, Todd hinted that he would retire from professional football. However, later that same day, he informed Danish press that he would consider another managerial position if he was approached.

Esbjerg fB
On 8 July, just 40 days after his final game in charge of Randers FC, Todd was announced as the new manager of the Superliga club Esbjerg fB, signing a one-year contract. On 17 July, Todd made his debut as Esbjerg manager in a 4–0 loss away to Brøndby IF. On 8 August, Todd got his first point in charge of Esbjerg, drawing 2–2 at home with AGF, having led the game 2–0. One week later, Esbjerg were handed a 2–1 defeat away to AaB, tying the worst start to a Superliga season in the club's history, having also just recorded one point in the first five games back in the 2010–11 edition of the tournament, back then ultimately resulting in relegation. One week later, Todd managed his first win in charge of Esbjerg, beating OB 3–2 at Blue Water Arena.

Following a tough half year as manager Todd was sacked on 5 December 2016 with Esbjerg being last in the league.

Personal life
Todd was born into a mining family in Chester-le-Street, County Durham. As a boy he was a fan of Newcastle United and could have signed for them, but he chose Sunderland because he preferred their approach to youth development. His son Andy is an assistant manager, having previously appeared under his father's management for Middlesbrough and Bolton.

Managerial statistics

* – Todd underwent a bypass operation in February 2014 and therefore missed the first five games of the spring season. His assistant Thomas Thomasberg was in charge in those games resulting in 3 draws and 2 defeats.

Honours

As a player
Sunderland
 FA Youth Cup finalist: 1965-66

Derby County
 First Division Title winner: 1971–72, 1974–75
 Texaco Cup winner: 1972
 FA Charity Shield winner: 1975

Oxford United
 Second Division Title winner: 1984–85

Individual
PFA Players' Player of the Year winner: 1974–75

As a manager
Bolton Wanderers
First Division Title winner: 1996–97

Individual
 League One Manager of the Month: October 2004

References

External links

bbc.co.uk Biography

1948 births
Living people
Sportspeople from Chester-le-Street
Footballers from County Durham
English footballers
Association football central defenders
Sunderland A.F.C. players
Derby County F.C. players
Everton F.C. players
Birmingham City F.C. players
Nottingham Forest F.C. players
Oxford United F.C. players
Vancouver Whitecaps (1974–1984) players
Luton Town F.C. players
England international footballers
England under-23 international footballers
English Football League players
North American Soccer League (1968–1984) players
English football managers
Expatriate football managers in Denmark
Middlesbrough F.C. managers
Bolton Wanderers F.C. managers
Swindon Town F.C. managers
Derby County F.C. managers
Bradford City A.F.C. managers
Randers FC managers
Darlington F.C. managers
Esbjerg fB managers
English Football League managers
Premier League managers
Danish Superliga managers
English Football League representative players
Vancouver Royals players
United Soccer Association players
English expatriate sportspeople in Canada
Expatriate soccer players in Canada
English expatriate footballers